Studholm is a civil parish in Kings County, New Brunswick, Canada.

For governance purposes it forms the local service district of the parish of Studholm, which further includes the service area of Lower Millstream. The local service district is a member of Regional Service Commission 8 (RSC8).

Origin of name
The parish was named in honour of Gilfred Studholme, a Loyalist military commander during the American Revolution, who later settled in the area and served on the first Executive Council of New Brunswick.

History
Studholm was erected in 1840 from Sussex Parish. It included Havelock Parish.

In 1859 the eastern polling district was erected as Havelock Parish.

In 1871 part of Havelock along Windgap Brook was returned to Studholm.

Boundaries
Studholm Parish is bounded:

on the northwest by the Queens County line;
on the east by a line beginning at a point on the Queens County line where the prolongation of the Miller Road strikes it, then south-southeasterly along the prolongation, Miller Road, and the southerly prolongation of Miller Road to Windgap Brook, then downstream until it strikes the prolongation of the southwestern line of a grant to James Caruth, which is on the southern bank of Windgap Brook and on the eastern side of Jordan Mountain Road, then southeasterly along the prolongation until it strikes the Cardwell Parish line;
on the southeast by a line beginning at the northeastern corner of a grant to Jacob Smith, about 975 metres north of the junction of Plumweseep Road and Back Road, then running north 66º east;
on the south by the Kennebecasis River;
on the west by a line beginning at the mouth of Halfway Brook and running north past O'Neill Road to the southwestern corner of a grant to Sarah Scovil that straddles Route 870 east of Upper Belleisle, then turning right and running northeasterly to the northeastern corner of a grant to Samuel Foster north of Searsville, the point being about 975 metres past Snyder Road, then generally northeasterly following the lines of grants to a point about 1.6 kilometres southeast of Route 870, on the prolongation of the northeastern line of a grant to Samuel Kierstead near Collina, then turning 90º and running northwesterly along the prolongation, the grant line on the southeastern side of Route 870, and the prolongation of the line until it strikes the Queens County line about 2.5 kilometres southwest of the Pearsonville Road.

Communities
Communities at least partly within the parish; italics indicate a name no longer in official use

Apohaqui
Berwick
Carsonville
Centreville
Collina
Fox Hill
Gibbon
Head of Millstream
Jordan Mountain
Kierstead Mountain
Lower Millstream
Marrtown
McGregor Brook
Mount Hebron
Mount Middleton
Mount Pisgah
Newtown
Parleeville
Pearsonville
Pleasant Ridge
Plumweseep
Roachville
Ryan Corner
Searsville
Smiths Creek
Snider Mountain
Summerfield
Thompson Corner

Bodies of water
Bodies of water at least partly in the parish:
Kennebecasis River
Millstream River
Smiths Creek
Mud Lake

Demographics

Population

Language

Access Routes
Highways and numbered routes that run through the parish, including external routes that start or finish at the parish limits:

Highways

Principal Routes

Secondary Routes:

External Routes:
None

See also
List of parishes in New Brunswick

Notes

References

Parishes of Kings County, New Brunswick